Davey Lee Whitney Sr. (January 8, 1930 – May 10, 2015), also known as "The Wiz", was an American college basketball coach and the head basketball coach at Texas Southern University from 1964 to 1969 and Alcorn State University from 1969 to 1989 and 1996 to 2003. He amassed a total record of 566 wins and 356 losses in 33 years of coaching at these institutions.

Early life
Davey Lee Whitney Sr. was born in Midway, Kentucky and attended Paul Laurence Dunbar High School in Lexington while living with friends. At Dunbar, Whitney played at guard on the basketball team and led his school to the 1947 and 1948 tournaments of the Kentucky High School Athletic League, the state's black high school league, and the 1948 league title.

He attended Kentucky State University and graduated in 1952. At Kentucky State, Whitney lettered in basketball, baseball, football, and track. After college, Whitney started out playing Negro American League baseball for the Kansas City Monarchs as shortstop and third baseman, from 1952 to 1954.

Coaching career
Whitney began his coaching career in 1954 as varsity basketball head coach at Burt High School in Clarksville, Tennessee. In ten seasons, Whitney led Burt to over 200 victories and the 1961 National Negro High School Basketball Championship.
He had his first collegiate job as head coach of Texas Southern University in 1964, but had only one winning season in five years. In 1969, he moved on to Alcorn A&M (which became Alcorn State in 1974), which had the reputation as a football school in the Southwestern Athletic Conference (SWAC).

Mainly recruiting local talent, Whitney was instrumental in making the Alcorn State men's basketball program a force in the SWAC during the 1970s and 1980s, with nine SWAC regular season titles. He led the Braves to the 1974 NAIA Division I men's basketball tournament championship game, the Braves' deepest postseason run to date. Two years after the Braves followed the SWAC to Division I, his Braves advanced to the second round of the 1979 National Invitation Tournament following an upset of Mississippi State in the first round.

In 1980, Alcorn State became the first HBCU to win a game in the NCAA Men's Division I Basketball Championship, after beating South Alabama in the first round. During his time at Alcorn, Whitney earned the nickname "The Wiz".

In 1989, Alcorn State fired Whitney after three straight losing seasons in which they only won 18 games total. Whitney later became an assistant coach for the Wichita Falls Texans of the Continental Basketball Association and was part of the Texans' 1991 championship team. He later was an assistant for the Mississippi Coast Gamblers of the United States Basketball League. He returned to Alcorn State in 1996, taking over a program that had tallied only one winning season since his departure. Within three years, he had the Braves back in the NCAA Tournament. He retired for good in 2003.

Whitney was known as a stern taskmaster, and his teams were a reflection of his hard-nosed personality. They were known for strong rebounding and tenacious defense. His 1998-99 team, for instance, was eighth in the nation in rebounding and gave up only 66.7 points per game.

Whitney set many records during his career at Alcorn, establishing himself as the second winningest coach in HBCU college basketball history behind the late Clarence "Big House" Gaines, who coached at Winston-Salem State University. He also owns the only postseason wins (NCAA and NIT) in Alcorn's history.

Whitney returned to Alcorn State two years after the Braves' home arena had been renamed the Davey Whitney Complex in his honor. He is thus one of the few Division I coaches to coach in an arena named after him.

He was inducted into the National Collegiate Basketball Hall of Fame in 2010.

Head coaching record

Death
Whitney died at his home in Biloxi, Mississippi on May 10, 2015 at the age of 85.

References

External links
 Tribute to Coach Davey Whitney by Senator Trent Lott, Congressional Record, vol. 145, no. 102 (July 19, 1999)
Davey Whitney at Negro Leagues Baseball Museum

1930 births
2015 deaths
African-American baseball players
African-American basketball coaches
African-American basketball players
Alcorn State Braves baseball coaches
Alcorn State Braves basketball coaches
American men's basketball players
Baseball players from Kentucky
Baseball shortstops
Baseball third basemen
Basketball coaches from Kentucky
Basketball players from Lexington, Kentucky
Continental Basketball Association coaches
Guards (basketball)
High school basketball coaches in the United States
Kansas City Monarchs players
Kentucky State Thorobreds basketball players
National Collegiate Basketball Hall of Fame inductees
People from Clarksville, Tennessee
People from Midway, Kentucky
Sportspeople from Lexington, Kentucky
Texas Southern Tigers men's basketball coaches
20th-century African-American sportspeople
21st-century African-American people